The Gardener's Magazine was the first British periodical devoted to horticulture. Full title was The gardener's magazine and register of rural & domestic improvement. It was written, edited and published by John Claudius Loudon starting in 1826.  It was initially published quarterly, increased its frequency to bi-monthly and then monthly. The publisher was Longman, Rees, Orme, Brown and Green, and the magazine was based in London. It ceased publication in 1844.

References 

Bi-monthly magazines published in the United Kingdom
Horticultural magazines published in the United Kingdom
Monthly magazines published in the United Kingdom
Quarterly magazines published in the United Kingdom
Magazines published in London
Magazines established in 1826
Magazines disestablished in 1844